My Life is an 1896 novella by Anton Chekhov, set in a provincial southern Russian city like Chekhov's own hometown of Taganrog.

Publication history
The novella first appeared in the October–December, Nos. 10–12, 1896 issues of the Monthly Literary Supplement to Niva magazine. Revised by the author, it was included into the Suvorin-published collection Peasants and My Life, to be reproduced, unchanged, in all of its 7 editions (1897–1899). With some additional changes edits Chekhov included in into Volume 9 of his Collected Works, published in 1899–1901 by Adolf Marks.

Background
Chekhov started working upon the novella in February 1896 and finished it in the late July of that year. There was some disagreement about the title. Chekhov hated "My Life" (in particular, the 'my' bit of it) and suggested that it should be called "In the Nineties" (В 90-х годах) instead. The Nivas editor Alexey Tikhonov-Lugovoy thought that was "too retro-sounding, as if it were some kind of memoirs", so the author decided against further arguing.

References

External links
 Моя жизнь. The original Russian text
 My Life, translated by Constance Garnett
  (Garnett translation)

1893 short stories
Novellas by Anton Chekhov
Works originally published in Russian magazines